Røldal Stave Church is a parish church of the Church of Norway in Ullensvang Municipality in Vestland county, Norway. It is located in the village of Røldal. It is the church for the Røldal parish which is part of the Hardanger og Voss prosti (deanery) in the Diocese of Bjørgvin. The brown, wooden stave church was built in around the year 1250 using designs by an unknown architect. The church seats about 130 people and is built in a long church design. The church is a preserved historic museum, but it is still a regularly-used parish church that holds regularly scheduled worship services twice a month.

History
The estimated construction date of the church is generally thought to be between 1200 and 1250. A soapstone baptismal font in the church is dated to the same period. A crucifix in the church dates from about 1250. The church has a rectangular-shaped nave and chancel. The Bergen Museum holds a variety of building components and other artifacts from the medieval church. These include altar frontal and wooden sculptures of St. Olaf from about 1250, of the Virgin Mary with child from about 1250, and the Archangel Michael, dated about 1200. In the Middle Ages, Røldal Church received large donations from many of pilgrims who flocked to the church. As a result, the small village where the church is located, became quite prosperous. In the 17th century the walls inside the church were richly decorated with paintings. The altarpiece dates to 1629. It was the design of German born painter Gottfried Hendtzschel from Breslau in Silesia.

In the 1840s, the nave was enlarged by adding on to the building to the west. During this reconstruction of the church in 1844, some of the history of the church was uncovered. This led to an investigation to determine how the church was built. The resulting belief is that Røldal Stave Church was quite different from other stave churches. Some controversy developed about whether this is in fact a stave church or rather an example of the assumed predecessor type, a post church.

From 1913 to 1918, the church underwent an extensive renovation and restoration. Paneling from the 19th century was removed and the Renaissance interior was restored. A new second floor seating gallery was also built around the church to protect the wall tables. The church reconstruction was led by Norwegian architect Jens Zetlitz Monrad Kielland (1866–1926), and the color restoration was performed by Norwegian painter Domenico Erdmann (1879–1940), who was assisted by Norwegian painter Alfred Obert Hagn (1882–1958), and Danish-Norwegian artist Ulrik Hendriksen (1891–1960).

Media gallery

See also
 List of churches in Bjørgvin

References

Other sources

External links

  Røldal stavkirke von 1250 in Røldal

Ullensvang
Churches in Vestland
Wooden churches in Norway
Stave churches in Norway
Buildings and structures completed in the 13th century
13th-century churches in Norway
Churches completed in 1250
13th-century establishments in Norway